Boyars is a surname. Notable people with the name include:
Arthur Boyars (1925–2017), British poet, musicologist, and publisher, married to Marion
Marion Boyars (1927–1999), American-British book publisher, married to Arthur

See also
Boyer
Boyar (surname)